Helen Moody defeated Helen Jacobs in the final, 6–3, 6–1 to win the ladies' singles tennis title at the 1932 Wimbledon Championships.

Cilly Aussem was the defending champion, but withdrew before the first round.

Seeds

  Helen Moody (champion)
  Simonne Mathieu (semifinals)
  Hilde Krahwinkel (quarterfinals)
  Eileen Fearnley-Whittingstall (quarterfinals)
  Helen Jacobs (final)
  Betty Nuthall (quarterfinals)
  Lolette Payot (third round)
  Dorothy Round (quarterfinals)

Draw

Finals

Top half

Section 1

Section 2

Section 3

Section 4

Bottom half

Section 5

Section 6

Section 7

Section 8

References

External links

Women's Singles
Wimbledon Championship by year – Women's singles
Wimbledon Championships - singles
Wimbledon Championships - singles